Berberis higginsiae is a shrub found only in a small region south and east of San Diego in southern California and northern Baja California.

Berberis higginsiae is evergreen, with thick, stiff compound leaves. It is similar to B. fremontii and B. haematocarpa but with narrower leaflets and yellowish-red berries.

The compound leaves place this species in the group sometimes segregated as the genus Mahonia.

References

higginsiae
Flora of California
Flora of Baja California
Natural history of the California chaparral and woodlands
Flora without expected TNC conservation status